The Indian Film Festival of Melbourne (IFFM) is a Victoria State Government-funded annual festival based in Melbourne founded in 2012. It is presented by Film Victoria, and the provider is chosen through a tender process. The current tender provider is Mind Blowing Films, run by Mitu Bhowmick Lange who is the Festival Director of IFFM. The festival has currently been provided with State Government funding until 2018. The goal of the film festival is to showcase Indian cinema to the Australian audience. The festival has streamed Bollywood films, Indie movies, documentaries, regional cinema from India etc. It also organizes short film competitions, dance competitions and a flag hoisting ceremony since it is during the time of Indian Independence day celebrations in Melbourne.

History 
The festival was founded in 2012 by the State Government of Victoria.  It was result of the Liberal Party of Australia (Victorian Division)’s policy "to strengthen Victoria's ties with the Indian film industries". The policy was first released in October 2006, was funded in November 2010, and implemented in March 2012 through a tender process.

Mind Blowing Films, owned by Mitu Bhowmick Lange, won the tender in March 2012 for three years until 2014, and was given one year extensions by the Liberal National Coalition Government for 2015 and 2016. 
In May 2012, The Sydney Morning Herald reported that the company behind the Festival was recycling films already released, and so appeared to be using government money to rebadge a festival it had already been running as a commercial enterprise.
In August 2017, South Indian film actress/producer Khushbu accused the Indian Film Festival of Melbourne of discriminating against  non-Hindi films and film stars. Mitu Bhowmick Lange responded with "I am very surprised to be honest because we have 60 films in 20 languages. The film festival has always always been about diversity," stating that some of the South Indian actors invited had not been able to attend due to busy schedules.

Mind Blowing Films was again awarded the contract for 2017 and 2018 by the new State Government in November 2016.

The film festival also facilitated a film project ‘My Melbourne’ where India's notable film makers worked with Victorian filmmakers to create short films on race, disability, sexuality, and gender.

Telstra People's Choice Award 
This award is given at the Festival for Outstanding Achievement of an Indian film in terms of box office revenue and critical appreciation for an Indian film released in that year. The award was instituted in 2014.

Recipients

2012 
In 2012, the IFFM  curated and showed 40 films modern Indian cinema, Bengali films and popular Indian films.

2013 
IFFM in 2013 consisted of Bollywood dance competition. The festival went on for 20 days on 5 screens in Melbourne and opened with India's first silent film ‘Raja Harish Chandra’ accompanied by a live band playing the background score along with the colored ‘Mughal-E-Azam’. Some of the more contemporary films included Bombay Talkies, Sholay and Talaash.  Some of the guests included Pamela Chopra, Vidya Balan Prabhudeva, Farah Khan, Simi Garewal, Kabir Khan, Onir; and Avtar Panesar.

2014 
IFFM International Screen Icon Award : Amitabh Bachchan (attended in person)

Best Film : Bhaag Milkha Bhaag

Best Indie Film : The Lunchbox

Telstra's People's Choice Award : Dhoom 3

Best Actress : Kangna Ranaut for Queen

Best Actor : Farhan Akhtar for Bhaag Milkha Bhaag and Irfan Khan for The Lunchbox

Special Jury Commendation : Anand Gandhi for The Ship of Theseus

Wester Union Best Director : Rakeysh Omprakash Mehra

2015 
In 2015, IFFM was a two weeks festival and had a theme of equality. The festival also incorporated interactive master classes, Awards Night, short film competition and Bollywood dance competition. Indian Independence day celebrations were included in IFFM from this year onwards.

The festival was launched by Minister for Creative Industries Martin Foley with Anil Kapoor and Sonam Kapoor. The winners were awarded at National Gallery of Victoria.

Other guests included Rajkumar Hirani, Simi Garewal, Imran Khan, Shonali Bose, Nagesh Kukunoor and Elahé Hiptoola.

IIFM Award for Cinematic Excellence : Anil Kapoor,

Best Film: Piku Best Director:

Shoojit Sircar for Piku

Best Indie Film: Kaaka Muttai ( Crows Eggs)

Telstra's People Choice Award: PK

Western Union Short Film Award: Rape- It's Your Fault (India) and Road to Grand Final (Aus)

Best Actor : Irrfan Khan for Piku and Shahid Kapoor for Haider

Best Actress: Bhumi Padnekar for Dum Lagake Haisha

2016 
The IFFM in 2016 opened with film parched and closed with Angry Indian Goddesses. The festival also included panel discussions about women in cinema and had guests Sue Maslin, Leena Yadav and Richa Chadha, who gave a master class on Bollywood and body positivity

Westpac Excellence In Cinema Award: Rishi Kapoor

Telstra Best Film: Kapoor & Sons

Westpac Best Indie Film Award: Parched

Westpac Best Director Award: Leena Yadav

Best Actor: Nawazuddin Siddiqi for Raman Ragav 2.0

Best Actress: Sonam Kapoor for Neerja

Western Union Short Film Festival Best Film Award: Josh Walker for Out on a Lim.

2017 
The Westpac IFFM Excellence in Global Cinema Award: Aishwarya Rai Bachchan

Best Indie Film: Lipstick Under My Burkha

Best Director: Nitesh Tiwari for Dangal

Equality in Cinema Award: Director/Actor Rahul Bose for Poorna

Best Actress : Konkona Sen Sharma for Lipstick Under my Burkha

Best Actor : Sushant Singh Rajput for Dhoni

Best Actor (Special Mention) : Raj Kumar Rao for Trapped,

Best Film : Pin People's Choice Award : Dangal & Bahubali 2,

Leadership in cinema: Karan Johar

2019 
IFFM 2019 was organized at Palais Theatre. Guests included Shah Rukh Khan, Karan Johar, Zoya Akhtar, Tabu, Sriram Raghavan, Malaika Arora and Arjun Kapoor. IFFM in 2019 was hosted by Karan Tacker.

2019 Award:

Best Short Film - Be my Brother, My name is Mohamad and Ragdad, We don't exist here anymore

Best Actor - Vijay Sethupathi for Super Deluxe

Best Actress - Tabu for Andhadhun

Best Director - Sriram Raghavan for Andhadhun

Best Film - Gully Boy

Best Indie Film - Bulbul Can Sing

IFFM Diversity Award: Onir

Telstra People's Choice Award: Simmba

PWC Equality in Cinema award an honorary award: Chuksit and Super Deluxe

IFFM Excellence in Cinema: Shah Rukh Khan

2020 
The festival in 2020 was delayed from its usual time in August to October because the pandemic. It included approximately 50 films in 17 languages.

2021 
The 2021 IFFM had 127 films in 27 languages including films by 34 film directors.

Best Feature Film: Soorarai Pottru

Best Performance Male (Feature): Suriya Sivakumar (Soorarai Pottru)

Best Performance Female (Feature): Vidya Balan (Sherni) & Honourable mention to Nimisha Sajayan (The Great Indian Kitchen)

Best Director: Anurag Basu (Ludo) & Honorary Mention Prithvi Konanur (Pinki Elli?)

Best Series: Mirzapur Season 2

Best Actress in a Series: Samantha Ruth Prabhu (The Family Man 2)

Best Actor in a Series: Manoj Bajpayee (The Family Man 2)

Equality in Cinema (Short Film): Sheer Qorma

Equality in Cinema Award (Feature Film): The Great Indian Kitchen

Best Indie Film: Fire in the Mountains

Diversity in Cinema Award: Pankaj Tripathi

Disruptor Award: Sanal Kumar Sasidharan

Best Documentary Film: Shut Up Sona

2022 
The 2022 IFFM was held from 12 August to 30 August.

 Best Feature Film: 83  by Kabir Khan
 Best Performance Male (Feature): Ranveer Singh for 83
 Best Performance Female (Feature): Shefali Shah for Jalsa
 Best Director: Jointly won by Shoojit Sircar for Sardar Udham and Aparna Sen for The Rapist
 Best Series: Mumbai Diaries 26/11 by Nikkhil Advani
 Best Actress in a Series: Sakshi Tanwar for MAI
 Best Actor in a Series: Mohit Raina for Mumbai Diaries 26/11
 Equality in Cinema Award (Feature Film): The team of Jalsa directed by Suresh Triveni
 Best Indie Film: Jaggi by Anmol Sidhu (Punjabi)
 Best Film from the Subcontinent:	Joyland
 Disruptor Award: Vaani Kapoor for Chandigarh Kare Aashiqui
 Best Documentary Film: A Night of Knowing Nothing by Payal Kapadia
 Lifetime Achievement Award - Kapil Dev
 Leadership in Cinema Award - Abhishek Bachchan
 Special screening of Ayena at Hoyts Melbourne Central followed by a Q & A session with Actor Ritu Saini, Faraha Khan and Director Nilanjan Bhattacharya on 15th Aug.
 Special screening of No Land's Man at Hoyts Melbourne Central followed by a Q & A session with Actor Megan Mitchell on 16th Aug
 Special screening of Jaggi at Hoyts Highpoint followed by a Q & A session with Director Anmol Sidhu, Actor Ramnish Chaudhary, Producer Dhruv Bakshi and co-producer & DOP Pradeep Kumar Mannan on 17th Aug
 Special screening of Shut Up Sona at Hoyts Highpoint followed by a Q & A session with Sona Mohapatra & World Premiere of Maali (Gardener) at Hoyts Melbourne Central followed by a Q & A session with the producer Pragya Kapoor, Sonali Rana and Director Shiv C. Shetty on 18th Aug
 Special screening of Joyland at Hoyts Melbourne Central followed by a Q & A session with director Sain Sadiq, Producer Apoorva Guru Charan, Actor Rasti Farooq, Alina Khan and Ali Junejo on 19th and World Premiere of Paraasakthi at Hoyts District Docklands followed by a Q&A session with Producer Apoorva Bakshi on 19th aug
 20 August, IFFM Closing Night Film at Hoyts District Docklands, Melbourne: The Rapist followed by Q&A session with the director Aparna Sen on Zoom

Notes

References 

Film festivals in Melbourne
Telstra People's Choice Award winners